Phrynobatrachus sternfeldi is a species of frog in the family Phrynobatrachidae. It is endemic to Central African Republic and only known from its type locality, "Fort Crampel". The specific name sternfeldi honours Richard Sternfeld, a German zoologist and herpetologist. Common name Sternfeld's river frog has been coined for this species.

There is no observations of this species after its discovery, and its ecology is essentially unknown.

References

sternfeldi
Frogs of Africa
Amphibians of the Central African Republic
Endemic fauna of the Central African Republic
Taxa named by Ernst Ahl
Amphibians described in 1924
Taxonomy articles created by Polbot